"Say" is the first and only single from rapper Method Man's fourth studio album, 4:21... The Day After. It samples Lauryn Hill's "So Much Things to Say" from MTV's Unplugged. The song finds Method Man addressing critics and fickle fans for disrespecting him, his swag and his Wu-Tang brethren.

2006 singles
Method Man songs
Song recordings produced by Erick Sermon
Def Jam Recordings singles
Songs written by Method Man